Jinul Puril Bojo Daesa ("Bojo Jinul"; 1158–1210), often called Jinul or Chinul for short, was a Korean monk of the Goryeo period, who is considered to be the most influential figure in the formation of Korean Seon (Zen) Buddhism.  He is credited as the founder of the Jogye Order, by working to unify the disparate sects in Korean Buddhism into a cohesive organization.

Biography 
Bojo Jinul's birthname was Jeong and by age 15 he left his family to ordain under Seon Master Jonghwi of the Sagulsan School, one of the nine mountain schools of Seon, receiving the ordination name "Jinul". This occurred in 1173.  By 1182, Jinul passed the royal examination for monks and qualified for a higher administrative position, but turned it down to join the Seon sangha at Bojesa in Pyongyang. The community being uninterested in his efforts to reform the retreat community, he moved to Cheongwonsa at Changpyeong, then Bomunsa on Hagasan.

During this period of travel and study, Jinul was said to have studied the entire Tripiṭaka and had a series of awakenings.  Jinul sought to establish a new movement within Korean Seon which he called the "samadhi and prajñā society". This movement's goal was to establish a new community of disciplined, pure-minded practitioners deep in the mountains. Jinul eventually accomplished this mission with the founding of Songgwangsa on Jogyesan, and in the process the Jogye Order, which taught a comprehensive approach to Buddhism including meditation, doctrine, chanting and lectures. By 1209, he completed his magnum opus the Excerpts from the Dharma Collection and Special Practice Record with Personal Notes, an extensive exploration of various schools of Chan Buddhism in China, with extensive commentaries on the writings of the Chinese monk Guifeng Zongmi as well as personal notes.

This earned him the respect of the Goryeo, and in particular King Huijong, who ordered that Mount Songgwangsan be renamed Jogyesan in his honor. Upon his death in 1210, he was given a posthumous title of honor by King Huijong as well.

Teachings

Essence-Function 

Essence-Function is a key concept of Korean Buddhism. Essence-Function takes a particular form in the philosophy and writings of Jinul.

View of Nirvana 

Jinul viewed Nirvana as a sublime essence that is present in all beings. This essence is the very nature of Buddha and has always been present in beings. Writing on the faith in such matters held by his own school, Jinul states:

Jinul further believed that the true nature of all people is unchanging and that their minds are ultimately numinous and marked by awareness, even when seemingly in a state of delusion. In a discussion of Buddhist schools, he writes:

Footnotes

Further reading
Buswell Jr., Robert E. Tracing Back the Radiance: Chinul's Korean Way of Zen. Honolulu: University of Hawaii Press, 1991.
Buswell Jr., Robert E. The Korean Approach to Zen: The Collected Works of Chinul. Honolulu: University of Hawaii Press, 1983.
Keel, Hee-Sung. Chinul: The Founder of the Korean Sŏn Tradition. Berkeley Buddhist Studies Series, 6. Berkeley: University of California at Berkeley, 1984.
Ko, Ik-chin. "Chinul's Explanation of Emptiness in the Meditation School." In Buddhism in Koryŏ: A Royal Religion, 103-138. Korea Research Monograph 22. Berkeley: University of California at Berkeley, 1996

External links

See also
 Korean philosophy

1158 births
1210 deaths
Goryeo Buddhist monks
12th-century Korean philosophers
Korean scholars of Buddhism
Seon Buddhist monks
Jogye Order
Founders of Buddhist sects